Mikułowice  is a village in the administrative district of Gmina Wojciechowice, within Opatów County, Świętokrzyskie Voivodeship, in south-central Poland.

The village has a population of 168.

References

Villages in Opatów County